Azimuth Islands  are a group of 4 small islands lying  northwest of Parallactic Islands in Holme Bay, Antarctica. They share their name with the largest island in the group, Azimuth Island. Mapped by Norwegian cartographers from air photos taken by the Lars Christensen Expedition, 1936-37. So named by Antarctic Names Committee of Australia (ANCA) because the largest island in the group was included in a triangulation survey by ANARE (Australian National Antarctic Research Expeditions) in 1959.

See also 
 Composite Antarctic Gazetteer
 List of Antarctic islands south of 60° S
 SCAR
 Territorial claims in Antarctica

References

External links

Islands of Mac. Robertson Land